John William Stratton (31 August 1875 – 29 October 1919) was an English cricketer.  Stratton was a right-handed batsman who bowled right-arm fast.  He was born in Turweston, Buckinghamshire and educated at Cheltenham College, where he represented the college cricket team, and Keble College, Oxford.

Stratton made his debut for Buckinghamshire in the 1895 Minor Counties Championship against Oxfordshire.  He played Minor counties cricket for Buckinghamshire from 1895 to 1901, making 27 appearances.  He made his only first-class appearance in 1896 for Oxford University against the Marylebone Cricket Club.  He took 3 wickets in the MCC first-innings for the cost of 93 runs.  His wickets were those of: Frank Phillips, Billy Murdoch and George Brann.  With the bat he scored a single run in the University's first-innings, before being dismissed by Albert Trott.  Oxford followed on in their second-innings, and he scored 7 runs before being dismissed by George Bean.

He died in Repton, Derbyshire on 29 October 1919.

References

External links
John Stratton at ESPNcricinfo
John Stratton at CricketArchive

1875 births
1919 deaths
People from Aylesbury Vale
People from Buckinghamshire
People educated at Cheltenham College
Alumni of Keble College, Oxford
English cricketers
Buckinghamshire cricketers
Oxford University cricketers
Sportspeople from Gloucestershire